Harbour Island or Harbor Island may refer to:

Harbor Island:
Harbor Island, Newport Beach, California, United States
Harbor Island, San Diego, California, United States 
Harbor Island, Phippsburg, Maine, United States
Harbor Island, Potagannissing Bay, Michigan, United States
Harbor Island (South Carolina) - one of the Sea Islands in Beaufort County, South Carolina, United States
Harbor Island, Seattle, Washington, United States
Harbor Island, North Carolina, located at Wrightsville Beach, North Carolina
Harbor Island, Orange, Texas

Harbour Island:
Harbour Island, a fortified islet off Sant-Maloù/Saint-Malo, Brittany, where Aaron of Aleth welcomed Saint Malo in the 5th century
Harbour Island, an islet off Sant-Ke-Porzh-Olued/Saint-Quay-Portrieux, Brittany, with a lighthouse
Harbour Island, Bahamas
Harbour Island (Little Bay Islands), Newfoundland and Labrador, Canada
Harbour Island (Ramea Islands), Newfoundland and Labrador, Canada
Harbour Island (Tampa), United States

See also
Coaster's Harbor Island
North Harbour Island